Aurélie Celia Rouge (born 25 May 1992) is a Martiniquais footballer who plays as a forward for the Martinique women's national team. She previously played for FF Yzeure Allier Auvergne.

Early life
Rouge began playing football at the age of six for a local club. At age 13, she joined Rivière Pilote.

Playing career

International 
Rouge competed with the Martinique women's national football team at the 2014 CONCACAF Women's Championship.

References

External links 
 

1992 births
Living people
People from Schœlcher
Martiniquais women's footballers
Women's association football forwards
Division 1 Féminine players
ASJ Soyaux-Charente players
Martinique women's international footballers